Alia Atreides  is a fictional character in the Dune universe created by Frank Herbert. Introduced in the first novel of the series, 1965's Dune, the character was originally killed in Herbert's first version of the manuscript. At the suggestion of Analog magazine editor John Campbell, Herbert kept her alive in the final draft. Alia would next appear as a main character in both Dune Messiah (1969) and Children of Dune (1976). The character is brought back as a ghola in the Brian Herbert/Kevin J. Anderson conclusion to the original series, Sandworms of Dune (2007).

In the novels, Alia is the daughter of Duke Leto Atreides of Caladan and his Bene Gesserit concubine, Lady Jessica, and the younger sister to Paul Atreides. Born on the planet Arrakis eight months after her father's death, she possesses the full powers of an adult Bene Gesserit Reverend Mother. Later known to her followers as St. Alia of the Knife, Alia is considered an Abomination by the Bene Gesserit because of the unique nature of her birth. As an adult, she becomes a devoted ally to Paul, and later regent for his children. She marries the ghola Duncan Idaho, but becomes possessed by the persona of her deceased maternal grandfather, Baron Vladimir Harkonnen.

Alia is portrayed by Alicia Witt in David Lynch's 1984 film adaptation, by Laura Burton in the 2000 miniseries Frank Herbert's Dune and by Daniela Amavia in its 2003 sequel, Frank Herbert's Children of Dune.

Description
The daughter of Duke Leto Atreides of Caladan and his Bene Gesserit concubine, Lady Jessica, Alia is the younger sister to Paul Atreides. During the events of Dune, Alia is born on the planet Arrakis in the year 10,191 A.G., eight months after her father's death. 
Because of the unique nature of her birth she possesses the consciousness of an adult Bene Gesserit; thus she is considered an Abomination by the Bene Gesserit. 
The Fremen woman Harah notices that four-year-old Alia "only pretends to be a little girl, that she has never been a little girl." She seeks to explain Alia's unique nature to the superstitious and wary Fremen. In the later years of her regency, Alia's enemies and victims among the Fremen call her Coan-Teen, "the female death spirit who walks without feet." An adult Alia is described by Herbert in Dune Messiah:

Novelist Brian Herbert, Frank Herbert's son and biographer, describes Alia as a "virgin witch" archetype. William Touponce explains, "Alia is the archetypal virgin-harlot, a Reverend Mother without motherhood, virgin priestess, witch, and object of fearful veneration for the superstitious masses".

Appearances

Dune
In Dune (1965), Alia is born a full Reverend Mother when she is exposed to the Water of Life (the bile of a drowned sandworm) in the womb as Lady Jessica undergoes the spice agony. Children born this way, called Abominations, are killed by the Bene Gesserit whenever possible because they have little defense against the personalities contained in Other Memory, the Bene Gesserit ability to access ancestral egos and memories. Without the existence of a strong personal identity, a child awakened to consciousness in utero is highly susceptible to becoming possessed by one of their ancestors. Jessica, despite her awareness of this likelihood, brings her baby to term, and Alia slowly learns to control the powers she has been granted as Reverend Mother and sister of the Kwisatz Haderach.

Alia is raised in a community of Fremen, led by her brother in an effort to control the planet and its production of melange. Alia is captured and the infant Leto killed in a Sardaukar raid on the sietch; she is presented to the Padishah Emperor Shaddam IV, who notes that she had been "in command of one of the attacking groups" of Fremen rebels ("mostly of women, children, and old men") that nearly decimated his raiding party. Mature far beyond her four years, Alia escapes during the final battle of Arrakeen, but not before pricking her grandfather, Baron Harkonnen, with a deadly, poisoned gom jabbar, also revealing her direct lineage to him in the process. Afterwards, she wanders the battlefield of Arrakeen killing fallen Sardaukar and Harkonnen soldiers with a crysknife, earning her the holy epithet "St. Alia of the Knife."

Alia uses her limited prescience in a unique way, projecting thoughts and images into the mind of the horrified Imperial Truthsayer, Gaius Helen Mohiam. Bene Gesserit Mohiam tells the Emperor that it is "Not telepathy. She's in my mind. She's like the ones before me, the ones who gave me their memories. She stands in my mind! She cannot be there, but she is!" Alia further explains that she cannot do this with everyone: "Unless I'm born as you, I cannot think as you." Alia soon communicates with Paul the same way:

Touponce suggests that Herbert's depiction of larval sandworms (or sandtrout), which hold back water in the desert to maintain the arid conditions their sandworm vector requires to thrive, is "an analogy for a stage of consciousness Alia can feel. Some of the ancestral voices within her mind hold back dangerous forces that could destroy her."

Dune Messiah
The character is further explored in 1969's Dune Messiah through her relationship with the ghola Hayt, who is Paul's teacher, Duncan Idaho, brought back from the dead by Tleilaxu means. Throughout the novel, there are hints of sexual tension between them as they work together to unravel the conspiracy against the Atreides. Hayt even steals a kiss from Alia, which upsets her; he responds by saying that he took nothing more than what was offered. Alia eventually agrees. When a blinded Paul departs into the desert, as is the Fremen custom for the blind, Alia is named Regent and the guardian of Paul's children: the heir, Leto II, and his sister, Ghanima. Shortly after, Alia marries Hayt, who has regained his full memory and is completely restored as Duncan. Alia gives the order to Fremen leader Stilgar to execute the Reverend Mother Mohiam and Spacing Guild Navigator Edric after the failure of their conspiracy  (with the Tleilaxu Face Dancer Scytale and the Princess Irulan of House Corrino) to seize the throne from Paul.

Touponce notes that "Alia will come to sexual maturity in [Dune Messiah] and discover an ascendant desire for a mate and political power." Hayt has been programmed by the Tleilaxu with three functions to be used against the Atreides, one of which is the seduction of Alia.

Children of Dune
In Children of Dune (1976), Alia becomes progressively more devious and power-hungry as she slowly succumbs to Abomination. Falling under the influence of the persona of her deceased grandfather, the Baron Harkonnen, Alia abuses her powers as Regent and becomes a ruthless tyrant. She allows the Baron access to her senses in exchange for his help fighting off the other personalities within her, but his sexual proclivities soon control her, compelling her to engage in sexual acts with one of her aides. During the exercise of his Mentat powers, Duncan comes to the realization that Alia has fallen into Abomination, and helps Jessica escape Alia's murderous plot.

The Preacher, actually Paul Atreides, returns once more to the steps of the temple and exposes Alia's conversion to Abomination to the Fremen. Her priests soon murder him, as Alia's nephew Leto II returns from hiding, his sister Ghanima in tow. The twins offer Alia their help conquering her inner lives, as they had. Alia then loses all control over the other personalities within her and they all fight for dominance over her. Leto realizes that the Baron's hold over her is too strong, and provides two options: a Trial of Possession, an ancient ritual that would guarantee the Baron's undoing; and the open window, high above the temple steps. As a helpless Jessica looks on, Alia regains control of her body long enough to leap out the window to her death.

Hunters of Dune
In the Brian Herbert/Kevin J. Anderson novel Hunters of Dune (2006), the Face Dancer  Khrone manages to restore the memories of the Baron Vladimir Harkonnen ghola. The Baron is displeased to note that Alia's voice haunts him in his head, somehow in a reversal of the influence he had over her while she was in the throes of Abomination in Children of Dune. Although not possessing the body of the Baron, Alia taunts him mercilessly.

Sandworms of Dune
In Sandworms of Dune (2007), the voice of Alia continues to irk the Baron, driving him to frequent outbursts that confuse those around him. Alia is recreated as a ghola on the no-ship Ithaca; in an attempt to grow Alia exactly as she had been in life, the axlotl tank is flooded with a near-lethal dose of the spice melange. Although the Alia ghola shows a great deal more maturity than would be expected for her age, she does not display any Other Memory or signs of Abomination. The reincarnated Baron Harkonnen murders the four-year-old Alia ghola on the Ithaca, but is soon murdered himself by the Wellington Yueh ghola.

In adaptations
Alia is portrayed by Alicia Witt in David Lynch's 1984 film adaptation, by Laura Burton in the 2000 miniseries Frank Herbert's Dune and by Daniela Amavia in its 2003 sequel, Frank Herbert's Children of Dune. Alia does not appear in the 2021 film Dune, which covers the first part of the book. The character is expected to appear in the upcoming sequel film.

Laura Fries of Variety wrote in 2003, "Amavia and [Julie] Cox as the tortured Alia and the put-upon Irulan offer layered performances". Emmet Asher-Perrin of Tor.com called Amavia's portrayal of Alia a "highlight" of the miniseries, and praised the attention paid to Alia's character development. Asher-Perrin praised the miniseries' departure from the novel in regard to Alia's fate:

Family tree

References

Dune (franchise) characters
Child characters in literature
Fictional suicides
Literary characters introduced in 1965